RAS p21 protein activator 4B is a protein that in humans is encoded by the RASA4B gene.

References

Further reading